The Lares are guardian deities in ancient Roman mythology.

Lares or LARES may also refer to:
 Lares, Africa, an Ancient city, former bishopric and present Latin Catholic titular see in present Tunisia
 Lares, Puerto Rico, a town in Puerto Rico
 Shelly Lares, American singer-songwriter
 LARES, former name of the Romanian airline TAROM
 LARES, an electroacoustic enhancement system
 LARES (satellite), a scientific satellite launched by the Italian Space Agency

See also 
 Larrés, a place in Spain
 Lare (disambiguation)
 Laris (disambiguation)